Muhammet Tunahan Taşçı (born 29 April 2002) is a professional footballer who plays as a midfielder for Dutch Eredivisie club Fortuna Sittard. Born in the Netherlands, Taşçı represents Turkey internationally.

Professional career
Taşçı began his footballing career in his local club VV Union at the age of 4, before moving to Vitesse and NEC to continue his youth development. Taşçı made his professional debut with Jong Ajax as a late sub in a 4-0 Eerste Divisie loss to Roda on 30 August 2020.

On 7 September 2021, he joined Fortuna Sittard and was assigned to club's Under-21 squad.

International career
Born in the Netherlands, Taşçı is of Turkish descent. He is a youth international for Turkey.

References

External links
 
 

Living people
2002 births
Footballers from Nijmegen
Association football midfielders
Turkish footballers
Turkey youth international footballers
Dutch footballers
Dutch people of Turkish descent
Jong Ajax players
Eerste Divisie players
Fortuna Sittard players
SBV Vitesse players
NEC Nijmegen players
Eredivisie players